The East Region of Singapore is one of the five regions in the city-state. The region is the 2nd most densely populated among the five, and has the smallest land area. Bedok is the region's most populous town and Tampines is the regional centre of the area. Comprising 11,000 hectares, it includes six planning areas and is also home to Singapore's Changi Airport and Paya Lebar Airbase

The region also houses the Paya Lebar Air Base, Changi Naval Base and Changi Prison, which was first constructed in 1936 by the British and is Singapore's oldest internment facility.

Geography

Government
The East Region is governed locally by two different Community Development Councils, namely the North East CDC and the South East CDC, both divided into six different planning areas.

Planning Areas

Economy
Manufacturing makes up majority of the economical activity in the region, with industrial estates located in the planning areas of Bedok, Changi, Pasir Ris, Tampines and Paya Lebar. Pasir Ris and Tampines Wafer Fabrication Parks houses several major semiconductor fabrication companies such as GlobalFoundries, UMC, SSMC and Siltronic. IBM had also set up a S$90 million technology park along Tampines Industrial Avenue, to manufacture its System Z mainframes and high-end POWER systems for its clients across Asia.

Changi is also a major aviation and commercial zone in the region with airlines such as, Singapore Airlines, Singapore Airlines Cargo, Jetstar Asia Airways, Scoot, Valuair and Tigerair having their head offices in the area. Changi Business Park, located in Changi South, also houses several commercial offices of business such as, DBS Bank, Standard Chartered and IBM.

Education
Residents living within the area have access to different educational facilities ranging from preschools to primary and secondary schools as these are located around the different towns in the East region. The area is also home to various tertiary institutions such as, ITE College East, Singapore University of Technology and Design, Tampines Meridian Junior College, Temasek Junior College, Temasek Polytechnic and Victoria Junior College, 6 international schools namely, Global Indian International School (GIIS), East Coast Campus, NPS International School, Sekolah Indonesia Singapura, Overseas Family School and United World College of South East Asia (Tampines Campus) and a special needs school, Katong School (APSN).

References

External links
 

 
Planning areas in Singapore
Regions of Singapore